Farther India, or Ultraindia, is an old term, now rarely used, for Southeast Asia, seen in colonial days from Europe as the part of the Far East beyond the Indian subcontinent, but south of China.

It refers to Indochina (Cambodia, Laos, Myanmar (aka Burma), Peninsular Malaysia, Thailand (former Siam), and Vietnam) and the Malay states (Brunei, East Malaysia and Singapore), but usually not including East Timor or the Philippines; these neighbouring predominantly Malay states usually belong to the wider East Indies (which includes all of the above as well as the Indian subcontinent).

Other uses 
Farther India is also a title of a book written by Sir Hugh Clifford.

See also 
 ASEAN
 Greater India

Sources and references

External links 
 A.N. Ram, Historical Perspectives

Southeast Asia
History of geography
Historical regions